CTi Entertainment is a satellite cable channel operated by Chung T'ien Television in Taiwan.

In August 2013, Chung T'ien Television launched CTi Entertainment 2, a sister channel to CTi Entertainment.

References

External links
 CTi Entertainment official website

Television stations in Taiwan
Television channels and stations established in 1994
1994 establishments in Taiwan